Almighty Thor is a superhero film directed by Christopher Olen Ray. The film, a mockbuster coinciding with the release of the Marvel Studios film Thor, was produced by The Asylum for $200,000. It premiered on the Syfy cable network on May 7, 2011 and was released on DVD on May 10, 2011 in the United States. The film was met with a largely negative response from critics. Loosely inspired by Norse mythology, the film follows the young warrior Thor (Cody Deal) in his battle against Loki (Richard Grieco).

In 2022, The Asylum released a second Thor film titled Thor: God of Thunder.

Plot 
When the god of deception Loki (Richard Grieco) wipes off the city of Valhalla to steal the Hammer Of Invincibility, only the young hero Thor (Cody Deal) can recover the cities from evil. When Thor's father and older brother are killed in a futile attempt to retrieve the hammer from Loki, a Valkyrie named Jarnsaxa (Patricia Velásquez) attempts to train a naïve and inexperienced warrior Thor to fight Loki. This leads them on a short quest from their training camp, to the Tree of Inventory  to collect a sword and shield and then to a small city where Loki attempts to hypnotize the refusing residents into serving as his minions by bringing on a  wipeout with a small army of demon beasts. When Thor is about to be defeated, he must forge his own fate to save the city and reclaim the Hammer Of Invincibility from Loki once and for all.

Cast
 Cody Deal as Thor
 Richard Grieco as Loki
 Patricia Velásquez as Járnsaxa
 Kevin Nash as Odin
 Jess Allen as Baldir
 Chris Ivan Cevic as Himdall
 Rodney Wilson as Hrothgar
 Kristen Kerr as Herja
 Charlie Glackin as Hundig
 Nicole Fox as Redhead Norn
 Leslea Fisher as Blonde Norn
 Lauren Halperin as Brunette Norn
 William Webb as Street Punk
 Jason Medbury as the Tree of Life Guardian

Release
Almighty Thor premiered on May 7, 2011, near the time of release of Marvel Studios' Thor,

Reviews
Almighty Thor received largely negative reviews from critics. Reviewing the film for The A.V. Club, Phil Dyess-Nugent gave "Almighty Thor" a rating
of "D−", taking issue with the film's low budget: "The film is so underpopulated that most of the awful deaths Loki inflicts go down off-camera; he points his stick or gives a command to his dogs, and then you hear somebody holler, "Argghhhh!!"" Dyess-Nugent also criticised the acting of the leads and took issue with the
producer's decision to shoot the LA scenes in abandoned parking lots: "The comic high point is a fight between Thor and Loki, with the guys spinning around and waving their weapons at each other while keeping one eye peeled for cops who might demand to see their filming permit." The Blueprint website review of the film stated, "This brain numbing 80 minutes of constant noise, cheap effects, background music that never once stops and ropey acting will test the patience of even the most hardened B-movie aficionado... Almighty Thor was just one giant headache of a film." The film was shown as part of the German TV show SchleFaZ in its third season.

References

External links
 Almighty Thor (4 Stars)
 Almighty Thor at The Asylum
 
 Cody Deal Interview for Almighty Thor
 February 2011 Interview with Cody Deal

2011 direct-to-video films
2010s fantasy adventure films
2011 independent films
2011 films
American fantasy adventure films
2010s English-language films
2010s superhero films
The Asylum films
Mockbuster films
Direct-to-video fantasy films
Films about Thor
Films shot in Los Angeles
American superhero films
Syfy original films
Films directed by Christopher Ray
American action adventure films
Fan films based on Marvel Comics
2010s American films
Films with screenplays by Eric Forsberg